Big Moose may refer to:

Places
 Big Moose Lake, a lake in the Adirondack region of upstate New York
 Big Moose, New York, a hamlet located on Big Moose Lake
Big Moose, New Brunswick, a community in Bathurst Parish, New Brunswick
 Big Moose Community Chapel, a historic chapel located on Big Moose Lake
 Big Moose Mountain, a mountain located in Piscataquis County, Maine
 Big Moose Lake, one of two so-named lakes in Minnesota
 Big Moose Lake, a lake in Carbon County, Montana
 Big Moose Scout Camp, a Boy Scouts of American camp in New York State

People
 Big Moose Meyer, a National Basketball Association player
 Big Moose Mason, a fictional character in the Archie Comics universe known as "Big Moose"
 Dave Noble, an American football player nicknamed "Big Moose"
 Norman Ross, an American competition swimmer nicknamed "Big Moose"
 Johnny "Big Moose" Walker, an American musician